Crafty is a chess program. Crafty or Crafties may also refer to:

 Crafty Games, an American publisher of role-playing games
 Crafties, students of Guitar Craft
 Crafty, mascot of Bristol-Plymouth Regional Technical School, East Taunton, Massachusetts, United States
 Crafty (illustrator) (1840 –1906), French equestrian illustrator born Victor Eugène Géruzez